Stoeneşti may refer to several places in Romania:

 Stoenești, Argeș, a commune in Argeș County
 Stoenești, Giurgiu, a commune in Giurgiu County
 Stoenești, Olt, a commune in Olt County
 Stoenești, Vâlcea, a commune in Vâlcea County
 Stoenești, a village in Modelu Commune, Călărași County
 Stoenești, a village in Florești-Stoenești Commune, Giurgiu County
 Stoenești, a village in Ariceștii Rahtivani Commune, Prahova County
 Stoenești, a village in Berislăvești Commune, Vâlcea County
 Stoienești, a village in Frecăței Commune, Brăila County

See also 
 Stoian (name)